The 1936 United States presidential election in Oregon took place on November 3, 1936, as part of the 1936 United States presidential election. Voters chose five representatives, or electors, to the Electoral College, who voted for president and vice president.

Incumbent President Franklin D. Roosevelt (D–New York), running with Vice President John Nance Garner, won Oregon in a landslide over Governor Alf Landon (R–Kansas) and running mate Frank Knox. Roosevelt took 64.42% of the popular vote to Landon's 29.64%, in what remains the strongest Democratic presidential performance in Oregon history.

Oregon was essentially a one-party Republican state during the Fourth Party System from 1896 to 1928, with the party winning almost every statewide election during the period. However, in 1932, due to massive economic discontent caused by the Great Depression, Franklin D. Roosevelt became the first Democrat since Horatio Seymour in 1868 to win a majority of the state's vote, carrying the Beaver State by an overwhelming 21 point margin. In 1936, the extremely popular Roosevelt greatly improved upon his 1932 margin, winning Oregon by nearly 35 percentage points. Even amidst a massive Democratic landslide, Oregon weighed in more than 10 points to the left of the nation, a striking departure from its historical status as a Republican stronghold.

Before the election, the primary focus was on power development in the water-rich and mountainous Pacific Northwest, especially the construction of major Federal dams and whether power rates for all users should be uniform. The Republican Party strongly supported private utilities, whilst Democrats generally supported at least some degree of public ownership and control of electric utilities.

As of 2020, Roosevelt remains the only Democrat (and the last candidate of any party) to sweep all of Oregon's counties in a presidential election. Additionally, the 1936 election remains the last in which a Democratic presidential candidate won Josephine County.

Results

Results by county

See also
 United States presidential elections in Oregon

References

Oregon
1936
1936 Oregon elections